The American Record Guide (ARG) is a classical music magazine. It has reviewed classical music recordings since 1935.

History and profile
The magazine was founded by Peter Hugh Reed in May 1935 as the American Music Lover.  It changed names to the American Record Guide in 1944.  Reed was its editor and publisher until 1957.

Since 1992, with the incorporation of the Musical America editorial functions into ARG, it started covering concerts, musicians, ensembles and orchestras in the US.

The magazine prides itself in having "500 reviews in every issue, written by a freelance staff of over 80 writers and music critics." In addition to new music releases, many issues in past years contained an overview of the recordings of a single composer's works. Most current issues do not feature these overviews. For overviews, there is an index included in every issue detailing which issue contains these overviews.

The editor, Donald Vroon, had been an NPR classical radio broadcaster and record reviewer in Buffalo, New York in the 1980s.

See also
 Phonograph Monthly Review

References

External links
Official website

1935 establishments in Ohio
Bimonthly magazines published in the United States
Music magazines published in the United States
Classical music magazines
Magazines established in 1935
Magazines published in Cincinnati